The 2006–07 Australian cricket season is made up of three domestic competitions for the men; the first-class Pura Cup, the List A Ford Ranger One Day Cup and the Twenty20 competition KFC Twenty20 Big Bash. The women compete in the Women's National Cricket League, although Tasmania does not have a first-class women's team. The season started on 11 October 2006 with a domestic Ford Ranger One Day Cup match between Queensland and Tasmania, and culminated with the World Cup Final between Australia and Sri Lanka on 28 April 2007.

The international season started with the Champions Trophy in October and November, followed by the 5-Test match Ashes series and a single Twenty20 match against England until early January. The English tour was followed by the 2006–07 Commonwealth Bank Series, an ODI triangular series against England and New Zealand which lasted until mid February. Later in the summer, Australia toured New Zealand, playing for the 2006–07 Chappell–Hadlee Trophy, and competed in the World Cup in March and April.

Roll of honour

International series
 Rose Bowl: Australia Women beat New Zealand Women 5–0 in 5-ODI series.
 Champions Trophy: Australia beat West Indies by eight wickets in the final.
 Ashes: Australia beat England 5–0 in 5-Test Match series.
 Commonwealth Bank Series: Australia finished first in pool table, but lost to England, who finished second in the pools, 2–0 in Best of 3 ODI Finals Series.
 Chappell–Hadlee Trophy: New Zealand won 3–0 in 3 Match ODI Series.
 2007 Cricket World Cup: Australia beat Sri Lanka in the final, undefeated throughout the tournament.

Domestic tournaments
 Pura Cup: Tasmanian Tigers defeated New South Wales Blues in Final.
 Ford Ranger One Day Cup: Queensland defeated Victoria in Final.
 KFC Twenty20 Big Bash: Victorian Bushrangers defeated Tasmanian Tigers in Final.
 Women's National Cricket League: New South Wales Breakers defeated Victoria Spirit 2–1 in the three-match final.
 Cricket Australia Cup (2nd XI): New South Wales Second XI finished first in the pool table.

International tours and tournaments

Champions Trophy

Ashes

The 2006–07 cricket series between Australia and England for the Ashes was played in Australia between 23 November 2006 and 5 January 2007. The five Test matches were at Brisbane, Adelaide, Perth, Melbourne and Sydney. Australia won the series 5–0, the first whitewash victory in 86 years, and regained the ashes that were held by England after its win in 2005. Australia also won the Twenty20 International.

Commonwealth Bank Series

Australia was a clear winner in the round robin stage, with 7 wins and only 1 loss, but lost against England in the best-of-3 series final.

Chappell–Hadlee Trophy

3 ODI matches between Australia and New Zealand to be held in New Zealand.

World Cup

The premier One Day International tournament was held in the West Indies from 13 March to 28 April. Australia topped their group in the competition, defeating Scotland, the Netherlands and South Africa along the way. They remained undefeated throughout the Super 8 stage of the competition and again topped the group table. They defeated South Africa in the semi-final and went on to complete an unbeaten tournament with victory over Sri Lanka in a rain-affected final.

Domestic competitions

Tables

For an explanation of the points system for the Pura Cup, please see Pura Cup#Points system.

Legend:
 W: Outright win
 DWF: Draws when first innings won
 DLF: Draws when first innings lost
 LWF: Losses when first innings won
 L: Losses

Matches

Squads

Notes

References
 Playfair Cricket Annual 2007
 Wisden Cricketers Almanack 2007

External links
 Cricket Australia
 Cricinfo
 CricketArchive

 
Australian Season
Australian Season
Cricket Season
Cricket Season